Just Room Enough Island, also known as Hub Island, is an island located in the Thousand Islands chain, in New York, United States. Purchased by the Sizeland family in the 1950s, the island has a house, a tree, shrubs, and a small beach.

History
The island was bought in the 1950s by the Sizeland family, who wanted a holiday getaway and built a house there. Because of the island's small size, in 2010, the Washington Post stated, "One misstep and you're swimming".

Geography
Just Room Enough lies on the Saint Lawrence River between Heart Island and Imperial Isle, close to the US border with Canada. The island is part of Alexandria Bay, a village within the town of Alexandria, Jefferson County, New York.

See also
List of notable Thousand Islands

References

External links
 

Islands of the Thousand Islands in New York (state)
Islands of Jefferson County, New York